Rosen Kaptiev (born 23 September 1979) is a Bulgarian footballer currently playing for Dunav Ruse as a forward.

Kaptiev has previously played in the Bulgarian A PFG for PFC Lokomotiv Sofia and PFC Spartak Varna.

References

External links

1979 births
Living people
Bulgarian footballers
FC Lokomotiv 1929 Sofia players
OFC Pirin Blagoevgrad players
PFC Rilski Sportist Samokov players
FK Vardar players
PFC Minyor Pernik players
PFC Spartak Varna players
FC Dunav Ruse players
PFC Ludogorets Razgrad players
First Professional Football League (Bulgaria) players
Expatriate footballers in North Macedonia
Bulgarian expatriates in North Macedonia
Association football forwards